Békásmegyer is a neighbourhood in Budapest, Hungary. It belongs administratively to District III. Békásmegyer consists of two different parts, a huge high-rise housing estate and the traditional Ófalu ("Old Village") with older houses. Békásmegyer is divided into two by the Szentendre HÉV line. Békásmegyer bal-oldal (left-side) and Békásmegyer jobb-oldal (right-side).  The left side was an independent village until 1 January 1950, when it was merged into Budapest, while the right side was a water reservoir of the Danube river. Today 41,000 people live in Békásmegyer Microdistrict (13,394 panel flats) and a few thousand in the former village.

Location
It is situated on the edge of Budapest next to Budakalász, at the edge of the Danube river and the hills of Buda. Békásmegyer has the last train station within the capital district of Budapest, which is the HÉV suburban railway line.

Name
The first recorded name of the village was Megyer, which refers to the fact that people from the Megyer tribe (who gave their name to Magyars) settled here after the migration of Hungarians into Pannonia in the early 10th century. Megyer belongs to the oldest strata of Hungarian toponymy.

In the second half of the 17th century Megyer was destroyed by the wars with Ottoman Turks. The village was resettled by German or Swabian colonist from the 1740s onwards. They called the village Krottendorf (literally "Frogbury") because of the frog-populated marshes of the Danube river meadows.

Hungarians called the village Békás-Megyer, meaning "Frog's Megyer", since the beginning of the 19th century. Now District III. is officially called Óbuda-Békásmegyer.

Population
By 1890 Békásmegyer had a population of 1340, 95% of Swabian (German) origin. A steady influx of Magyars resulted in a ten-fold increase in the total population by the second world war, and dilution of the Swabians to less than 25%. In 1946 three-quarters of the Swabians were expropriated and expelled to war ravaged West Germany. During the 1970s and 1980s Békásmegyers' population increased rapidly because the construction of the new microdistrict (about from a few thousand to 50,000-55,000).

See also
 Óbuda
 Óbuda-Békásmegyer

External links
 The official website of Budapest's Third District

External links

Óbuda-Békásmegyer
Neighbourhoods of Budapest
Former municipalities of Hungary